The Government High School Pakkay Wala is a boys-only high school. It is situated on the Jhang-Sargodha Road near Jhang Sadar, Punjab, Pakistan.

The school was established in 1926. The enrollment is around 581. Ch. Abdul Rehman the current Head. The school faculty has about 18 members.

References

External links

1926 establishments in India
Educational institutions established in 1926
Jhang District
Schools in Punjab, Pakistan
High schools in Pakistan
Boys' schools in Pakistan